Sârbi is a commune in Bihor County, Crișana, Romania with a population of 2,609 people. It is composed of seven villages: Almașu Mic (Szalárdalmás), Burzuc (Borszeg), Chioag (Kővág), Fegernic (Almásfegyvernek), Fegernicu Nou (Újfegyvernek), Sarcău (Szarkó) and Sârbi.

The oldest attested names for Fegernicu are Fegwernuk (1077-1097) and Olwar (1266).

References

Communes in Bihor County
Localities in Crișana
Slovak communities in Romania